Aluf Tomer Bar (born 1969) is an Israeli general and current commander of the Israeli Air Force. Before his selection to succeed Amikam Norkin as commander of the IAF, Bar served as head of the IDF Force Design Directorate, a rejiggered version of what was once the Planning Directorate.

Biography
Bar was born in 1969, one of six children of Erela and Natan Bar. He enlisted in the IDF in 1987 and completed pilot course with honors in 1989.

He served as a F-16 fighter pilot with the 110, 116 and 140 Squadrons. After a period of study in the United States, he was assigned as an F-15 pilot with the 133 Squadron in 1998.
 
From 1999 to 2002, he served as head of the Operations Branch at the Air Force Headquarters. In 2005, Bar was appointed commander of the 
69 Squadron, which was equipped with the F-15I, and commanded the squadron during the Second Lebanon War. 
During his tenure, the squadron have undertaken Operation Orchard, the destruction of a Syrian nuclear site on September 6, 2007. During his service, he served as head of the Air Force's Operations Department for three years, including during Operation Cast Lead.
In 2010, he was appointed commander of the Israeli Air Force Flight Academy, and served in that position until 2012.

In February 2012, he was promoted to the rank of brigadier general and appointed commander of the Tel Nof Airbase, where he took part in the training of UAV operators and commanded the base during Operation Pillar of Cloud. On October 17, 2017, he was appointed chief of staff of the Air Force, and served in that position until October 22, 2019, including during the February 2018 Israel–Syria incident. On June 18, 2020, he was promoted to the rank of Major General, and was appointed Head of the IDF Force Design Directorate on June 21.

In September 2021, he was announced as the next appointee of commander of the IAF and on April 4, 2022, Bar was appointed commander of the IAF, replacing Major General Amikam Norkin.

Awards and decorations
Tomer Bar was awarded three campaign ribbons for his service during three conflicts.

References

Israeli Air Force generals
Israeli aviators
Israeli Jews
1969 births
Living people